State Highway 194 (SH 194) is a  state highway that travels from near Dimmitt southeast to Plainview in the Texas Panhandle.

History
SH 194 was designated on its current route on February 9, 1933. On September 26, 1939, the designation was extended from Plainview southeast through Petersburg, then southwest through Slaton to Tahoka, replacing SH 280. On October 22, 1940, the section of SH 194 from 3.6 miles north of the Hale-Lubbock County Line to Slaton was cancelled. On November 22, 1940, the section from Plainview to 3.6 miles north of the Hale-Lubbock County Line was cancelled. On March 6, 1941, the section of SH 194 from Slaton to Tahoka was cancelled.  The current route parallels the Burlington Northern railway along its entire route, except for the final half mile in Plainview.

Major intersections

References

194
Transportation in Castro County, Texas
Transportation in Swisher County, Texas
Transportation in Hale County, Texas